Gordon Cheung (born 1975) is a contemporary artist who currently lives and works in London.

Early life
Gordon Cheung was born and raised in London, UK. Cheung received his Bachelor of Arts (Hons) at Central Saint Martins and Master of Fine Arts at the Royal College of Art, where he graduated in 2001. Whilst a student, he instigated and was the organizer of 'Assembly' – exhibiting 172 MA art graduates in 2 disused Victorian school buildings.

Exhibitions
He exhibits internationally and was in the largest and most ambitious survey of recent developments in art from the UK; The British Art Show 6 and The John Moores Painting 24. He was commissioned for a Laing Art Solo Award (Selected by Susan May) in July of 2007. 2009 solo shows include 'The Promised Land', Jack Shainman Gallery, New York, 'Art in the Age of Anxiety' Volta NYC, New York and 'The Four Horsemen of the Apocalypse', The New Art Gallery Walsall UK. Cheung's first US solo museum exhibition was at the Arizona State University Art Museum in 2010.

Collections
Hirshhorn Museum 
Whitworth Museum 
ASU Art Museum 
The New Art Gallery Walsall
Knoxville Museum of Art 
Museum of Modern Art, New York
UK Government art collection
British Museum
Hiscox Collection

References

External links 
 Official Website

1975 births
Living people
Alumni of the Royal College of Art
Artists from London
British people of Hong Kong descent